The 2011 Wimbledon Championships Men's singles final was the championship tennis match of the men's singles tournament at the 2011 Wimbledon Championships, played between Rafael Nadal and Novak Djokovic. This match is a significant part of the Djokovic–Nadal rivalry, as it was the fifth final in a row played between the two in the 2011 season and the first one in a major tournament that season. Nadal and Djokovic were the top two players at the time, entering the Championships as the world No. 1 and No. 2, respectively. Djokovic won all of their four previous finals in the 2011 season, while Nadal won all their five previous encounters at the majors. Nadal was also the defending champion (and two-time champion overall).

After 2 hours and 28 minutes, second-seeded Djokovic defeated first-seeded Nadal 6–4, 6–1, 1–6, 6–3 to win the match. This was the first time Djokovic defeated Nadal at a major, the first of an eventual seven Wimbledon titles for Djokovic, and the first time a Serbian won a Wimbledon singles title.

Background 

The match took place on the final day of the 2011 edition of the 13-day Wimbledon Championships, held every June and July. Rafael Nadal was the world no. 1 entering Wimbledon, and was the top-seed in Wimbledon for the first time in his career. Djokovic was the world no. 2 and was seeded second. Both were in contention for the No. 1 ranking, which Djokovic gained by defeating Jo-Wilfried Tsonga in the semifinal. Nadal was going for his third Wimbledon title, while Djokovic was in a Wimbledon final for the first time in his career. Nadal came to the final with a 20-match winning streak at Wimbledon (starting from 2008) while Djokovic came to the final with a 47-1 win-loss record in the 2011 season.

Match
Rafael Nadal won the pre-match coin toss and chose to receive, Novak Djokovic elected to stay. In the first nine games of the first set, both players held serve quite comfortably, without facing any break points or deuces. On the tenth game, Djokovic turned a 30-0 deficit and won the next three returning points to create a first set point for himself. A forehand unforced error by Nadal after the return granted the first set to Djokovic, 6-4. 

The second set was one-sided. Djokovic trailed 0-30 in the first game of the set but won his next four service points and took the first game of the set. On the second game, a back unforced error mid-rally by Nadal gave Djokovic another break point. Djokovic countered a drop-shot from Nadal to break Nadal for the second time in the match for a 2-0 lead in the second set. Djokovic's second break in the set came at the sixth game, when a forehand cross-court by Djokovic forced an error from Nadal to give Djokovic a double break lead of 5-1. Djokovic successfully served to love for the second set and took it 6-1. Djokovic wasn't facing any break points or deuces during the first two sets. 

The third set was also one-sided, this time for Nadal's side. In the first game, Djokovic managed to reduce a 40-0 deficit to 40-30, but Nadal won the next point to hold serve. On the second game, Nadal got his first break point opportunity after a forehand unforced error from Djokovic. Nadal took the break when Djokovic sent a backhand shot to the net, to give Nadal a 2-0 lead in the third set. Like in the second set, Nadal got another chance to break Djokovic when the latter again sent a forehand shot outside the singles' line to give Nadal two break points. Djokovic managed to save those break points to create the first deuce of the match, but Nadal created a third break point by forcing an error on Djokovic's forehand. Djokovic double-faulted on the third break point of the game to give Nadal a 5-1 lead in the third set. Like Djokovic in the second set, Nadal served to love for the third set to take it 6-1 and force a fourth set in the match. 

In the fourth set momentum changed from side to side a couple of times. Nadal created a break point opportunity on the first game of the set, by forcing a backhand error on Djokovic with his forehand. Djokovic saved the break point by coming to the net in the beginning of the rally, creating the second deuce of the match. Unlike the third set, this time Djokovic managed to hold his service game eventually, when two returns of serve from Nadal went long.
On the second game, a drop-volley mid-rally from Djokovic created two break chances for him. He took the first one when Nadal sent a forehand shot to the net to give Djokovic a 2-0 lead in the fourth set. Nadal broke him right back, using the net with the return on his break point. Neither player managed to create a break point or a deuce in the next four games. On the eighth game of the set, while leading 4-3, Djokovic won the first three points as a returner to get three break point opportunities. Nadal managed to save the first break point with a forehand winner that landed deep on the baseline, but Djokovic took the second break opportunity with a backhand unforced error from Nadal that went long. The break gave Djokovic a 5-3 lead and a chance to serve for the match. At 30-30 in the ninth game, Djokovic served-and-volleyed to create his first championship point opportunity, which he converted after a backhand from Nadal landed out of the court. 

After his win, Djokovic noticeably ate some of the Centre Court grass, a ritual he has repeated every time he won the Wimbledon Championships title in upcoming years.

Statistics

Source

Significance
Novak Djokovic's achievements in 2011 Wimbledon gave him the no. 1 ranking for the first time in his career, and made this achievement stronger by defeating the outgoing no. 1 Rafael Nadal in the final. 
This was the first time in six attempts Novak Djokovic won against Rafael Nadal in a Grand Slam match; it was also Djokovic's first win over Nadal on grass (Nadal won the first two encounters on the grass surface). 
It was the first time since 2002 Wimbledon that Wimbledon was won by a player other than Roger Federer or Rafael Nadal, a span of 8 events. 
By defeating Rafael Nadal in the final, Novak Djokovic became the second man to defeat Nadal in a Wimbledon final as well as in a Grand Slam final - the first one was Roger Federer. 
As of 2022 Wimbledon, 2011 was the last time Rafael Nadal reached a Wimbledon final.

See also 
Djokovic-Nadal rivalry
2012 Australian Open – Men's singles final
2012 French Open – Men's singles final
2020 French Open – Men's singles final

Notes

References

External links
 Match details, official ATP site
 Player Head to Head, official ATP site

 

 

2011 Wimbledon Championships
2011
Novak Djokovic tennis matches
Rafael Nadal tennis matches